Michael Anthony Amodeo (born June 22, 1952) is a retired professional ice hockey player who played 300 games in the World Hockey Association and 19 games in the National Hockey League. He played for the Ottawa Nationals, Toronto Toros, and Winnipeg Jets. As a youth, he played in the 1965 Quebec International Pee-Wee Hockey Tournament with the Scarboro Lions minor ice hockey team. Also he finished his career in Europe playing in Sweden and Italy.

Career statistics

References

External links

1952 births
Living people
California Golden Seals draft picks
Canadian ice hockey defencemen
HC Merano players
Niagara Falls Flyers (1960–1972) players
Örebro IK players
Ottawa Nationals players
Rochester Americans players
Ice hockey people from Toronto
Toronto Marlboros players
Toronto Toros players
Tulsa Oilers (1964–1984) players
Winnipeg Jets (1979–1996) players
Winnipeg Jets (WHA) players